Marcos Assis de Santana, also known as Marcão (born September 25, 1985 in Camaçari), is a Brazilian footballer who acts as a striker for Bento Gonçalves.

Career

He began his professional career at Ipitanga of Bahia, where it was called "Marquinhos". But before his stature began to be called when Marcão was working at Atlético Clube Goianiense advocating since 2008.

Série C was the top scorer in 2008 with Atletico Goianiense. It is the top scorer in the Série C of all time with 25 goals.

Honours

Atlético Goianiense
Goiás State League: 2010
Brazilian Série C: 2008

References

External links
Profile at zerozerofootball.com

1985 births
Living people
Brazilian footballers
Brazilian expatriate footballers
Atlético Clube Goianiense players
Club Athletico Paranaense players
América Futebol Clube (MG) players
Esporte Clube Bahia players
Figueirense FC players
Al-Shaab CSC players
Goiás Esporte Clube players
Botafogo Futebol Clube (SP) players
Paysandu Sport Club players
Clube de Regatas Brasil players
Guarani FC players
Esporte Clube São Luiz players
Clube do Remo players
Clube Esportivo Bento Gonçalves players
Campeonato Brasileiro Série A players
Campeonato Brasileiro Série B players
Campeonato Brasileiro Série C players
UAE Pro League players
Association football forwards
Brazilian expatriate sportspeople in the United Arab Emirates
Expatriate footballers in the United Arab Emirates
People from Camaçari
Sportspeople from Bahia